The 2021 CPL–U Sports Draft was the third annual CPL–U Sports Draft. Eight Canadian Premier League (CPL) teams selected 16 eligible U Sports athletes in total when the draft was held on January 29, 2021.

Format
Each CPL team made two selection in the U Sports Draft. Players could be selected if they had years of U Sports eligibility remaining and had declared for the draft. In 2021, a total of 48 athletes declared for the draft.

The draft used a snake format with the order reversing directions between the two rounds. The selection order in the first round is the reverse of the previous season's standings.

Player selection

Round 1

Round 2

Retained
The following players signed development contracts with their respective CPL teams in 2020 and had U Sports eligibility remaining. Their CPL clubs chose to retain their rights for another year, exempting them from the draft.

Selection statistics

Draftees by nationality

Canadian draftees by province

Draftees by university

References

2021 Canadian Premier League
2021
January 2021 sports events in Canada
2021 in Canadian soccer